Luna City is the name of a fictional colony on the Moon in science fiction stories, comic books, and games by numerous authors.

Poul Anderson 
 "Brake" (Anderson), from The Psychotechnic League

Isaac Asimov 
 "Waterclap"

Robert A. Heinlein 
 Have Space Suit—Will Travel
 Job: A Comedy of Justice
 The Moon Is A Harsh Mistress
 Future History stories, including
 "It's Great to Be Back!"
 "Space Jockey"
 "The Menace from Earth"

John Varley 
 The Eight Worlds stories

Other 
 Judge Dredd (comic book)
 Moon Patrol (arcade video game)
 Mutant Chronicles (role-playing game)